Liars Academy Is a rock band from Baltimore, Maryland, formed in 2000. They have released their material on Equal Vision Records and Goodwill Records. The band has included members/former members of Cross My Heart, Dead Red Sea, Daybreak, and Strike Anywhere.

History
Liars Academy was formed by ex-Cross My Heart guitarist/songwriter Ryan Shelkett and Strike Anywhere guitarist Matt Smith. The duo recruited drum veteran Evan Tanner (Cross My Heart Pee-Tanks, Hidden Hand) to play drums and began playing shows in 2001.  Due to Smith's prior commitments to Strike Anywhere, and Liars Academy's busy tour schedule, Matt was unable to be a full-time member of the band.  At this point Chris Camden (Former Cross My Heart bassist and Daybreak guitarist) was recruited to play bass on tour. Things came together on that tour and Camden became a full-time member of Liars Academy at this point. Matt Smith, in turn, moved to Lead Guitar and the four-piece line-up took shape for Liars Academy leading to the next phase in their development as a band. Having releasing the album No News Is Good News in 2001. The band made two records as this line-up, 2002's Trading My Life EP and 2004's Demons LP. The band members were dealt a blow when their equipment was stolen, forcing them to cancel the remainder of their tour. A donation from the Music Cares foundation allowed them to start touring again, but they had lost the momentum they had built since the album's release. Matt Smith wasn't able to juggle duties between Liars Academy and Strike Anywhere due to the rise in popularity of the latter band, and Fred Fritz replaced him. Tanner left in the fall of 2004, with Eric Fauver (also formerly of Daybreak) replacing him on drums. After a year of playing as this line-up, Liars Academy split up in May 2005.

A slightly modified version of Liars Academy continued to perform under the name Midnight Revival. The group consisted of Ryan Shelkett, Fred Fritz, Eric Fauver and Nick Barkley (ex-Fairweather, ex-Olympia) on bass. Chris Camden spent time playing bass in Firebird Band during this time. In late 2006 they decided to restart Liars Academy, and appeared as a five-piece with the addition of Bryan Elliott as an additional guitarist, but the reunion was brief. This line up, however, recorded two songs for a 7-inch on Goodwill which came out in 2007.

In December 2012, Liars Academy reunited for one show with Strike Anywhere at The Ottobar, Baltimore for former roadie Tony Pence's 40th Birthday Celebration.

Drummer Eric Fauver died on June 2, 2015.

Post Liars Academy Projects
Evan Tanner is currently the drummer of War on Women. Eric Fauver was the drummer of Beasts Of No Nation, and Final Conflict, as well as the bassist of Iron Cross before his death in 2015. Ryan Shelkett formed Desert Boys following the hiatus of Liars Academy. He is currently performing as a solo artist. Matt Smith is currently the guitarist of Senses Fail and Strike Anywhere.

Former members
 Ryan Shelkett- Vocals, Guitar
 Chris Camden - Bass, Vocals
 Fred Fritz - Guitar, Vocals
 Matt Smith - Guitar, Vocals
 Evan Tanner - Drums
 Bryan Elliott - Guitar, Vocals (deceased)
 Eric Fauver - Drums (deceased)

Discography

EPs
 Trading My Life CD EP (2002), Equal Vision
 Run For Cover 7-inch EP (2007), Goodwill

Albums
 No News is Good News (2001), Equal Vision
 Demons (2004), Equal Vision
 Ghosts (2023), Steadfast Records

References

External links
 Official Myspace site

Equal Vision Records artists
Indie rock musical groups from Maryland
Musical groups from Baltimore
Musical groups established in 2000